Kenny Drew Jr. (June 14, 1958 – August 3, 2014) was an American jazz pianist. His music is known for its hard-swinging bluesy sound and large, two-handed rooty chords contrasting with fast runs. The son of jazz pianist Kenny Drew, he did not credit his father as an influence.

Biography
His initial study was in classical music with his aunt and grandmother. In his teens he became interested in jazz and pop, but initially worked in funk bands. Later he went into jazz piano and in 1990 won The Great American Jazz Piano Competition in Jacksonville, Florida. Drew continued to perform jazz, but he also performed some chamber music. His style has some similarities to his father's, but is different enough to generally avoid comparison; he was considered the more eclectic of the two men.

Drew attended Iona College in New Rochelle, New York, for a period during 1977 to 1978. There, he became pianist for the Iona College Singers, an entertainment troop promoting the college's name and goodwill among local high schools, retirement homes and the like in the Northeast region of the US.

Drew cited Thelonious Monk as an influence and like Monk often recorded (and performed) solo.

Drew died at home in St. Petersburg, Florida, on August 3, 2014.

Discography

As leader

Main source:

As sideman
 1987: Charnett Moffett - The Net Man (Blue Note Records)
 1987: Charnett Moffett - Beauty Within (Blue Note Records)
 1987: Charnett Moffett - Beauty Within (Blue Note Records)
 1993: Hal Melia - Waduyathink (Positive Music)
 1993: Mingus Big Band - Mingus Big Band 93: Nostalgia in Times Square (Dreyfus Records)
 1993: Carl Allen & Manhattan Projects - Echoes of our Heroes (Evidence Music)
 1994: Steve Slagle - Reincarnation (Steeplechase)
 1995: Stanley Turrentine - T Time (MusicMasters Records)
 1995: Michael Philip Mossman - Spring Dance (Claves Jazz (Switzerland))
 1995: John Tank - So In Love (TCB Records)
 1995: Daniel Schnyder - Nucleus (Enja)
 1995: Jack Walrath - Journey, Man! (Evidence Music)
 1995: Ron McClure - Inner Account (Steeplechase)
 1995: Mingus Big Band - Gunslinging Bird (Dreyfus Records)
 1996: Nat Adderley, Jeff Berlin, and Kenny Drew Jr.: Monk in the Sun 
 1996: Mingus Big Band - Live in Time (Dreyfus Records)
 1996: Jack Wilkins-Kenny Drew Jr. Quartet - Keep in Touch (Claves Jazz)
 1996: Ronnie Cuber - In a New York Minute (Steeplechase)
 1997: George A. Johnson -  Turqoise Connection (A Records / Challenge Records)
 1998: David "Bubba" Brooks - Smooth Sailing (TCB Records)
 1998: Warren Vaché - Plays Harry Warren: An Affair to Remember (Zéphyr Records (Brussels))
 1998: Michael Philip Mossman - Spring Dance (TCB Records)
 2000: Daniel Schnyder - Words Within Music (Enja)
 2000: Paul F. Kendall/Bob Leto - Excursions (Brownstone Recordings)
 2000: Johnny Griffin - Nucleus (Storyville)
 2000: Daniel Schnyder - An Evening at Sea (Chiaroscuro Records)
 2001: Paul F. Kendall/Bob Leto - Red Top (Brownstone Recordings)
 2001: Paquito D'Rivera - Excursions (Enja)
 2002: Cody Moffett - My Favorite Things (TCB Records)
 2002: Daniel Schnyder - Songbook (CCn'C)
 2002: Butch Miles - Straight On Till Morning (Nagel Heyer Records)
 2003: Daniel Schnyder/Kenny Drew Jr. Quartet - Da Skale (TCB Records)
 2004: Richard Drexler - Señor Juan Brahms  (Nicolosi Productions) 
 2003: Martirio - Primavera en Nueva York  (Sony BMG)
 2009: Jeff Rupert – From Memphis to Mobile (Random Act)
 2010: Daniel Schnyder - Worlds Beyond Faust (Col Legno)
 2017: Kevin Çelebi - Purge Corruption (Nikki & Heidi Records) (posthumous release)

References

External links
Verve Music Group discography of Kenny Drew, Jr.
Fanpage

1958 births
2014 deaths
American jazz pianists
American male pianists
Musicians from New York City
Verve Records artists
Milestone Records artists
Antilles Records artists
20th-century American pianists
Jazz musicians from New York (state)
20th-century American male musicians
American male jazz musicians
Mingus Big Band members